The women's high jump event at the 2023 European Athletics Indoor Championships will be held on 2 March at 19:05 (qualification) and 5 March at 10:20 (final) local time.

Medalists

Records

Results

Qualification
Qualification: Qualifying performance 1.94 (Q) or at least 8 best performers (q) advance to the Final.

Final

References

2023 European Athletics Indoor Championships
High jump at the European Athletics Indoor Championships